Christer Gullstrand (born 26 March 1959) is a Swedish sprinter. He competed in the men's 4 × 400 metres relay at the 1984 Summer Olympics.

References

External links
 

1959 births
Living people
Athletes (track and field) at the 1980 Summer Olympics
Athletes (track and field) at the 1984 Summer Olympics
Swedish male sprinters
Swedish male hurdlers
Olympic athletes of Sweden
Sportspeople from Linköping